is an otome adventure game developed by Ruby Party and published by Koei. It is a part of Ruby Party's Neoromance label.

Because of Harukanaru Toki no Naka des success, the game has given rise to a franchise including several sequels, numerous drama and music CDs, a manga series, two OAVs, a movie, and an anime television series, and a live-action theatrical.

Plot
On the first day of a new school term, high school student Akane Motomiya, her classmate Tenma Morimura, and their underclass friend Shimon Nagareyama are sucked into a mysterious old well. Initially, Akane is bewildered by her new circumstances, but she gradually comes to face up to her own destiny and understand the world of Kyō.

Gameplay
Harukanaru Toki no Naka de places the player in the role of a girl who is surrounded by attractive young men, and gives her the option of trying to win the heart of one and live happily ever after. The heroine must also fight evil with the help of the attractive young men. The result is a hybrid game with a visual novel–like interaction mode, a simple role-playing video game battle mode, and a board game–like map.

Haruka is made up of ten chapters, eight of which involve the core gameplay. These chapters take place over a two-week period and involve traveling around the Kyō map, searching for various key items. Kyō is made up of roughly 20 areas and it is possible to visit three in one day. However, most areas are possessed by  vengeful ghosts that must be dispelled before you can enter, and fighting them consumes one of the three visit chances.

Harukas battle system is limited in comparison to most CRPGs of its day. The maximum party size is 3 characters, but only Akane is under the direct control of the player. Though Akane can attack and defend, her other abilities – the use of healing items and spells, and the ability to encourage her comrades, are more useful. There is no magic point system as such. Casting spells is based on the morale of the Hachiyō members and the number of elemental  cards Akane has. Furthermore, there is no experience system and the character's hit points are refilled automatically between fights. The main reward for fighting, besides gaining entrance to a given area, is the chance to gain the trust of Hachiyō. The greater a Hachiyō member's rapport with Akane, the more effective he will be in battle.

Characters

Main charactersVoiced by: 
The main protagonist, she is a cheerful, forthright high school freshman. This character's default name is Akane, but the player can pick other names for her. She is the only person capable of communicating with the Ryūjin, and with the help of the Hachiyō, she can use the powers of the five elements to defeat the onryō that the Oni Clan has unleashed throughout Kyō.Voiced by: 
Yorihisa is a samurai in the service of the Imperial court. Serious and disciplined, he swears fealty to Akane as his master, and he always obeys Akane's commands. His elemental attribute is Wind, and his dragon jewel is located on his left ear.Voiced by: 
Tenma is Akane's classmate and friend, who is pulled into Kyō with her. He has little concern for formality and can be abrasive, but he has a strong sense of responsibility to others. Tenma's younger sister has been missing for some time. His elemental attribute is Thunder, and his dragon jewel is located on his left arm.Voiced by: 
Inori is a blacksmith's apprentice. He has a fierce hatred of Oni. Though he can be hot-headed, Inori has an open, honest personality, and he values his family. His elemental attribute is Fire, and his dragon jewel is located on his forehead.Voiced by: 
Shimon is a junior high student and a friend of Akane who also is pulled into Kyō. The Oni Clan is said to have blond hair and blue eyes, and because Shimon has a similar appearance, the people of Kyō often mistake him for an Oni. His elemental attribute is Earth, and his dragon jewel is located on the back of his right hand.Voiced by: 
Takamichi is a nobleman, and he works in the government as the Vice Minister of Civil Affairs. He has a serious but calm personality, and a strong sense of justice. His elemental attribute is Heaven, and his dragon jewel is located on the right side of his neck.Voiced by: 
Like Takamichi, Tomomasa is a nobleman, employed as a Lieutenant of the Left Imperial Guard. He is aloof and easy-going, and though he hides it much of the time, he is a good judge of character. His elemental attribute is Swamp, and his dragon jewel is located between his collar bones.Voiced by: 
Eisen is the Emperor's half-brother who has left the Imperial Family and become a monk. He is a refined youth who hates conflict. He plays the flute skillfully. His elemental attribute is Water, and his dragon jewel is located in the palm of his left hand.Voiced by: 
Yasuaki is an Onmyōji, and a disciple to the famous, historical Onmyōji Abe no Seimei. He is cold and analytical. Because he is an artificial human created by Abe no Seimei, Yasuaki lacks human emotions. His elemental attribute is Mountain, and his dragon jewel is located beneath his right eye.Voiced by: 
She is the only remaining descendant of the Star Clan, who is destined to assist the Ryūjin no Miko. Fujihime is very responsible, and laments that her young age keeps her from being a greater help to Akane.

Oni ClanVoiced by: 
The leader of the Oni Clan, he summoned Akane to Kyō. Akuram intends to use Akane's powers to rule Kyō. Akuram is a callous leader, who sees his fellow Oni as pawns.Voiced by: 
An Aide to Akuram, Ikutidaal is in love with Inori's older sister, Seri, and the divide between Oni and humans causes him to suffer.Voiced by: 
The only female among the Oni Clan, Shirin holds affection for Akuram. She flaunts her feminine charms as a shirabyoshi, and uses them to snare men. There was even a small chapter in the manga where she offered herself to Takamichi, but he refused her, sensing a sort of distrust about her when she danced for the officials. In the end of the chapter, he fights her to defend Akane and wounds her arm. Instead of killing her like most men would, he, instead, bandaged up her arm. If one were to look very closely at the scene, you could see her blushing and having a very thoughtful expression as she watches him wrap the sling around her forearm and as she leaves him to go back to Akuram.Voiced by: 
This half-human, half-Oni boy was abandoned at birth, but Akuram took him in and raised him. Sefuru has no love for the Ryūjin no Miko.'''
Voiced by: 
The one among the Oni Clan that can summon Onryō. Ran is actually Tenma's long lost sister, whom Akuram abducted.

Themes
The world of Harukanaru Toki no Naka de is based on the height of the Heian Period of Japanese history, and many aspects of Heian culture, as described in the great literature of the time, are depicted in the game.

Releases
All titles developed by Ruby Party and published by Koei / Koei Tecmo unless noted. List does not include limited editions, classic, or treasure box releases.

Other Haruka video games
All titles developed by Ruby Party and published by Koei / Koei Tecmo unless noted. List does not include limited editions, classic, or treasure box releases.

Adaptations

Manga
The first Haruka: Beyond the Stream of Time game was adapted into a manga series serialized in the Japanese manga magazine LaLa DX. The series was also printed in volumes published by Hakusensha. The manga was illustrated by Tohko Mizuno, who was also the game's character designer.

The manga series was licensed in English by Viz Media as Haruka: Beyond the Stream of Time for serialization in their Shojo Beat magazine as well as tankōbon releases. The Japanese and English editions of the manga both were collected in 17 volumes.

The sixth video game series received a manga adaptation in Kodansha's Aria magazine by the game's character designer Tohko Mizuno in 2015.

Anime
There have been multiple anime adaptations of Haruka: Beyond the Stream of Time. The first OVA  was directed by Iku Suzuki and produced by Zexcs. It was released in 2002 in two episodes and was based on the first video game. Ajisai Yumegatari describes briefly Akane's coming to Kyou and her involvement with the Hachiyou.

An anime television series called Harukanaru Toki no Naka de Hachiyō Shō was produced by Yumeta Company and adapted Mizuno's manga adaptation of the story line of the first game. It was directed by Aki Tsunaki, and aired from 2004 to 2005 for 26 episodes. It was dubbed and released in English as Haruka: Beyond the Stream of Time: A Tale of the Eight Guardians. The anime series was followed by two OVA episodes Ten and Chi. On August 19, 2006, a feature film titled  was released. Tubi TV later added the series.

Other Haruka installments received OVA adaptations.  was produced by Yumeta Company and was released in three episodes from 2003 to 2005, covering the storyline of the second installment of the video game franchise. The third installment received several OVAs:  was released on December 28, 2007 by Yumeta Company and was directed by Toshiya Shinohara. It was released as a single OVA with a bonus "Onsen Chibi special". On January 3, 2010, a sequel  was released. It was directed by Shigeru Kimiya.

Movie
A live action movie was also released in early 2008 in Japan.

Other games
The Koei Tecmo crossover game Warriors All-Stars is the first title featuring Haruka series elements to appear in an official release outside of Japan. The game features many characters from across Koei Tecmo's history of games, including the Haruka series itself, with characters from the sixth entry, Hajime Arima and Darius, included as playable. Arima is available as one of the initial playable characters, while Darius can only be unlocked under certain conditions.

Related products

CD

Drama CD
 (two parts)

Variety CD
 (a mail-in present for buying the Hachiyo- Misato Ibun drama series)

 (LaLa magazine special)
 (LaLa magazine special)

Vocal and soundtrack CD

Reception
On release, Famitsu magazine scored the Game Boy Advance version of the game a 31 out of 40.

The manga adaptation was generally received poorly, with reviewers recommending other fantasy manga such as Inuyasha or Fushigi Yuugi instead. One reviewer said, "Looking past the fact that the plot is blatant rip-off of Fushigi Yûgi, Haruka is so poorly written as to be almost incomprehensible to anyone who hasn’t played the game." Another stated that "The very ending of the [last] volume, and thereby the series as a whole, suffers from a lack of explanation", but did offer praise for the art, saying "Mizuno's drawings really are a pleasure to look at."

See also
 Harukanaru Toki no Naka de Hachiyō Shō Harukanaru Toki no Naka de 2 Harukanaru Toki no Naka de 3 Angelique Kiniro no Corda''

References

External links
 Koei's Neoromance site 
  (omnibus manga and anime entry)
 Harutoki at Cyberiando.com (in Spanish)

2000 manga
2000 video games
2002 anime OVAs
2003 anime OVAs
2004 anime television series debuts
2005 anime OVAs
2006 anime films
2007 anime OVAs
Game Boy Advance games
Hakusensha manga
Japan-exclusive video games
Koei games
Otome games
PlayStation (console) games
Video games developed in Japan
Video games featuring female protagonists
Visual novels
Zexcs